Sean Lurie is an American feature film producer who is credited on multiple animated features. After a career spanning traditional animation management and digital ink and paint, Sean established himself as an animated feature film producer on such titles as The Rugrats Movie, Rugrats in Paris: The Movie, and The Wild Thornberrys Movie. Sean was hired by DisneyToon Studios (DTS) in 2004 and produced the second CGI feature produced at DTS, entitled Tinker Bell and the Lost Treasure, of which John Lasseter is listed as executive producer. Sean is also the producer of Tinker Bell and the Mysterious Winter Woods.

In June 2010 Sean was promoted to VP of Production for The Walt Disney Company/Disney Toon Studios and as of January 2014 he is VP of Development for the Walt Disney Animation Studios.

He was nominated for an Oscar in 2016 for Inner Workings.

Sean is married with two children, and lives in Los Angeles.

References

External links
 

Film producers from California
People from Los Angeles
Living people
Year of birth missing (living people)